Ash is both a given name (commonly a shortened version of Ashton, Ashley, and Ashlyn) and a surname. The name is gender neutral.

Notable people and fictional characters with the name include:

Given name

People 

 Ash Hamdan (born 1975), Palestinian Jordanian English teacher and a writer

 Ash Amin (born 1955), British geographer
 Ash Atalla (born 1972), British television producer
 Ash Baron-Cohen (born 1967), British film director, usually credited as "Ash"
 Ashleigh Barty (born 1996), Australian tennis player
 Ash Bowie (born c. 1968), American indie musician
 Ash Carter (1954-2022), American physicist, professor, and former U.S. Secretary of Defense

Fictional characters 
 Ash, the protagonist of fantasy novel Ash: A Secret History
 Ash (Alien), an android in the 1979 science fiction horror film Alien
 Ash (Avalon), the main protagonist in the 2001 science fiction film Avalon
 Ash (Echo), a character portrayed by Tasya Teles in the TV series The 100
 Ash (MÄR), a character in the manga and anime series MÄR
 Ash, a character in the animated films Sing and Sing 2
 Ash (Supernatural), a recurring character on the TV series Supernatural
 Ash, a character in the Titanfall series
 Ash Crimson, one of the protagonists of the King of Fighters video game series
 Ash Dove, a recurring character in the TV series H2O: Just Add Water
 Ash Fox, the son of Mr. Fox in the animated film Fantastic Mr. Fox
 Ash Kaur, a character from EastEnders
 Ash Ketchum, the main protagonist of the anime series Pokémon
 Ash Lynx, the main character of the manga and anime series Banana Fish
 Ash Tyler, the chief of security of the USS Discovery in the TV series Star Trek: Discovery
 Ash Williams, the hero of the Evil Dead film series
 Ash Graven, supporting protagonist in the animated sci-fi series Final Space

Surname

People 
 Aesha Ash (born 1977), American ballet dancer
 Bill Ash (1917–2014), Canadian-American fighter pilot
 Brandon Ash (born 1977), American racing driver
 Brian Ash (born 1974), American screenwriter
 Brian Ash (bibliographer) (1936–2010), bibliographer
 Daniel Ash (born 1957), British guitarist
 Ed Ash, American car engine constructor
 Eileen Ash (1911–2021), English cricketer
 Eric Ash (born 1928), British electrical engineer and former Rector of Imperial College
 George Ash (1859–1897), a South Australian newspaper editor, lawyer, and parliamentarian
 Gord Ash (born 1951), Canadian baseball manager
 Haruhiko Ash, Japanese rock singer
 Isaac Colton Ash (1861–1933), American banker, real-estate dealer, and politician
 John Ash (disambiguation), several people
 Ken Ash (1901–1979) American baseball pitcher
 Kevin Ash (1959–2013), British motorcycle journalist and writer
 Lauren Ash (born 1983), Canadian actress and comedian
 Leslie Ash (born 1960), British actress
 Marvin Ash (1914–1974), pseudonym of the American jazz pianist Marvin Ashbaugh
 Mary Kay Ash (1918–2001), American businesswoman
 Meir Eisenstadt (1670–1744), rabbi and author also known as Meir Ash
 Meir Eisenstaedter (1780–1852), rabbi, Talmudist, and paytan (liturgic poet) also known as Meir Ash
 Rob Ash (born 1951), American football coach
 Russell Ash (1946–2010), British writer
 Sam Ash, born Samuel Ashkynase (1897–1956), American businessman
 Sam Ash (actor) (1884–1951), American vaudeville singer and film actor
 Timothy Garton Ash (born 1955), British academic historian and writer
 Victor Ash (disambiguation), several people
 William H. Ash (1859–1908), African-American politician and former slave

Fictional characters 
 Ash, one of the main characters from the film Sing
 Captain Ash, a recurring character in the video game series TimeSplitters
 Nina Ash, a character in the TV series Angel
 Randolph Henry Ash, a Victorian poet in the novel Possession: A Romance by A. S. Byatt

See also 
Oisc of Kent (pronounced “Ash”) (d. 512), semi-legendary king of Kent
Asch (surname)
Ash (disambiguation)
Ashe (disambiguation)
Ashe (name)

Lists of people by nickname
Hypocorisms